Francis I (Francis Stephen; ; ; ; 8 December 1708 – 18 August 1765) was Holy Roman Emperor, Archduke of Austria, Duke of Lorraine and Bar, and Grand Duke of Tuscany. He became the ruler of the Holy Roman Empire, Austria, and Tuscany through his marriage to Maria Theresa, daughter of Emperor Charles VI. Francis was the last non-Habsburg monarch of both the Empire and Austria, which were effectively governed by Maria Theresa. The couple were the founders of the Habsburg-Lorraine dynasty, and their marriage produced sixteen children.  

Francis was the fourth (but oldest surviving) son of Leopold, Duke of Lorraine, and the French princess Élisabeth Charlotte d'Orléans. Duke Leopold died in 1729, and was succeeded by his son. In 1736, Francis married Maria Theresa. In 1738, he left the Duchy of Lorraine and Bar for the deposed Polish king Stanisław Leszczyński in exchange for the Grand Duchy of Tuscany, as one of the terms ending the War of the Polish Succession. Following the death of his father-in-law, Charles VI, in 1740, Francis and his wife became the rulers of the Habsburg domains. Maria Theresa gave her husband responsibility for the empire's financial affairs, which he handled well. Francis died in 1765 and was succeeded by his son Joseph II, who co-ruled Austria alongside Maria Theresa.

Early life

Francis was born in Nancy, Lorraine (now in France), the oldest surviving son of Leopold, Duke of Lorraine, and his wife Princess Élisabeth Charlotte d'Orléans. He was connected with the Habsburgs through his grandmother Eleonore, daughter of Emperor Ferdinand III. He was very close to his brother Charles and sister Anne Charlotte.

Emperor Charles VI favoured the family, who, besides being his cousins, had served the house of Austria with distinction. He had designed to marry his daughter Maria Theresa to Francis' older brother Leopold Clement. On Leopold Clement's death, Charles adopted the younger brother as his future son-in-law. Francis was brought up in Vienna with Maria Theresa with the understanding that they were to be married, and a real affection arose between them.

At the age of 15, when he was brought to Vienna, he was established in the Silesian Duchy of Teschen, which had been mediatised and granted to his father by the emperor in 1722. Francis succeeded his father as Duke of Lorraine in 1729. In 1731 he was initiated into freemasonry (Grand Lodge of England) by John Theophilus Desaguliers at a specially convened lodge in The Hague at the house of the British Ambassador, Philip Stanhope, 4th Earl of Chesterfield. During a subsequent visit to England, Francis was made a Master Mason at another specially convened lodge at Houghton Hall, the Norfolk estate of British Prime Minister Robert Walpole.

Maria Theresa arranged for Francis to become "Lord Lieutenant" (locumtenens) of Hungary in 1732. He was not excited about this position, but Maria Theresa wanted him closer to her. In June 1732 he agreed to go to the Hungarian capital, Pressburg (today's Bratislava).

When the War of the Polish Succession broke out in 1733, France used it as an opportunity to seize Lorraine, since France's prime minister, Cardinal Fleury, was concerned that, as a Habsburg possession, it would bring Austrian power too close to France.

A preliminary peace was concluded in October 1735 and ratified in the Treaty of Vienna in November 1738. Under its terms, Stanisław I, the father-in-law of King Louis XV and the losing claimant to the Polish throne, received Lorraine, while Francis, in compensation for his loss, was made heir to the Grand Duchy of Tuscany, which he would inherit in 1737.

Although fighting stopped after the preliminary peace, the final peace settlement had to wait until the death of the last Medici Grand Duke of Tuscany, Gian Gastone de' Medici in 1737, to allow the territorial exchanges provided for by the peace settlement to go into effect.

In March 1736 the Emperor persuaded Francis, his future son-in-law, to secretly exchange Lorraine for the Grand Duchy of Tuscany. France had demanded that Maria Theresa's fiancé surrender his ancestral Duchy of Lorraine to accommodate the deposed King of Poland. The Emperor considered other possibilities (such as marrying her to the future Charles III of Spain) before announcing the engagement of the couple. If something were to go wrong, Francis would become governor of the Austrian Netherlands.

Elisabeth of Parma had also wanted the Grand Duchy of Tuscany for her son Charles III of Spain; Gian Gastone de' Medici was childless and was related to Elisabeth via her great-grandmother Margherita de' Medici. As a result, Elisabeth's sons could claim by right of being a descendant of Margherita.

On 31 January 1736 Francis agreed to marry Maria Theresa. He hesitated three times (and laid down the feather before signing). Especially his mother Élisabeth Charlotte d'Orléans and his brother Prince Charles Alexander of Lorraine were against the loss of Lorraine. On 1 February, Maria Theresa sent Francis a letter: she would withdraw from her future reign, when a male successor for her father appeared.

Marriage

They married on 12 February in the Augustinian Church, Vienna. The wedding was held on 14 February 1736. The (secret) treaty between the Emperor and Francis was signed on 4 May 1736. On 5 January 1737, instruments of cession were signed at Pontremoli between Spain and the Empire, with Spain ceding Parma, Piacenza and Tuscany to the Holy Roman Empire and the Empire recognizing Don Carlos of Spain as King of Naples and Sicily.  On 10 January, the Spanish troops began their withdrawal from Tuscany, and were replaced by 6,000 Austrians. On 24 January 1737 Francis received Tuscany from his father-in-law. Until then, Maria Theresa was Duchess of Lorraine.

Gian Gastone de' Medici, who died on 9 July 1737, was the second cousin of Francis (Gian Gastone and Francis' father Leopold were both great-grandchildren of Francis II, Duke of Lorraine), who also had Medici blood through his maternal great-great-grandmother Marie de' Medici, Queen consort of France and Navarre. In June 1737 Francis went to Hungary again to fight against the Turks. In October 1738 he was back in Vienna. On 17 December 1738 the couple travelled south, accompanied by his brother Charles to visit Florence for three months. They arrived on 20 January 1739.

In 1744 Francis' brother Charles married a younger sister of Maria Theresa, Archduchess Maria Anna of Austria. In 1744 Charles became governor of the Austrian Netherlands, a post he held until his death in 1780.

Reign

In the Treaty of Füssen, Maria Theresa secured his election as Emperor, which took place on 13 September 1745. He succeeded Charles VII, and she made him co-regent of her hereditary dominions.

Francis was well content to leave the wielding of power to his able wife. He had a natural fund of good sense and brilliant business capacity and was a useful assistant to Maria Theresa in the laborious task of governing the complicated Austrian dominions, but he was not active in politics or diplomacy. However, his wife left him in charge of the financial affairs, which he managed well until his death. Heavily indebted and on the verge of bankruptcy at the end of the Seven Years' War, the Austrian Empire was in a better financial condition than France or Great Britain in the 1780s. He also took a great interest in the natural sciences.

Francis was a serial adulterer; many of his affairs well-known and indiscreet, notably one with Princess Maria Wilhelmina of Auersperg, who was thirty years his junior. This particular affair was remarked upon in the letters and journals of visitors to the court and in those of his children.

He died suddenly in his carriage while returning from the opera at Innsbruck on 18 August 1765.  He is buried in tomb number 55 in the Imperial Crypt in Vienna.

Maria Theresa and Francis I had sixteen children, amongst them the last pre-revolutionary queen consort of France, their youngest daughter, Marie Antoinette (1755–1793). Francis was succeeded as Emperor by his eldest son, Joseph II, and as Grand Duke of Tuscany by his younger son, Peter Leopold (later Emperor Leopold II). Maria Theresa retained the government of her dominions until her own death in 1780.

Issue

Ancestry

See also
 Franz Joseph Toussaint
 Kings of Germany family tree
 List of people with the most children
 Francis Stephen Award

References

External links
 
 Tomáš Kleisner – Jan Boublík, Coins and Medals of the Emperor Francis Stephen of Lorraine Prague 2011 
 

1708 births
1765 deaths
18th-century Holy Roman Emperors
18th-century archdukes of Austria
Francis 2
Austrian Freemasons
Austrian Roman Catholics
Austrian people of French descent
Roman Catholic Freemasons
House of Habsburg-Lorraine
Hereditary Princes of Lorraine
Dukes of Teschen
Dukes of Lorraine
Grand Princes of Tuscany
Jure uxoris kings
Princes of Lorraine
Fellows of the Royal Society
Grand Masters of the Order of the Golden Fleece
Knights of the Golden Fleece of Austria
Burials at the Imperial Crypt
Burials at St. Stephen's Cathedral, Vienna
Nobility from Nancy, France
18th century in the Grand Duchy of Tuscany
18th-century French people
Freemasons of the Premier Grand Lodge of England
Recipients of the Military Order of Maria Theresa
Dukes of Carniola